Okolehao is a Hawaiian alcoholic spirit whose main ingredient was the root of the ti plant. Okolehao's forerunner was a fermented ti root beverage or beer. When distillation techniques were introduced by English seamen in 1790, it was distilled into a highly alcoholic spirit.

Hawaiians discovered that if the ti root is baked, a sweet liquid migrates to the surface of the root. Chemically, the heat changes the starch in the root to a fermentable sugar. The baked root is then soaked in a vat of water which dissolves the sugar, and fermentation begins. The fermented drink was later distilled into a highly alcoholic spirit which became Hawaii's only indigenous distilled spirit, and was prized by the king. The Merrie Monarch, King David Kalakaua, is said to have had his own distiller.

Etymology
The name is from the iron try pots that were brought ashore from sailing ships and converted into stills, and literally meant "iron butt", from Hawaiian ʻōkole ("butt") + hao ("iron").

History
After the initial production of okolehao in 1790, Hawaiians added sugar cane as another fermentable. When pineapple was introduced, this too was sometimes added for its sugar content. When Japanese and Chinese immigrants arrived to work in the sugarcane and pineapple fields they brought with them their native rice. The propagated rice was also sometimes added to the formula. By the beginning of World War II Hawaiians were producing okolehao of various formulations, all of which were sold to US military personnel located at the many bases in Hawaii. Spirit alcohol made from grains was rationed during the war and used for fuel by the military forces; the resulting shortage was good for okolehao sales, but encouraged many hastily produced inferior products. When the war was over, the production of okolehao gradually died out as rum and vodka became readily available and better-tasting than the crude okolehao then being produced.

Just as moonshine on the mainland was produced using various formulas, okolehao was produced using various fermentable ingredients such as taro. Aging in used whiskey barrels improved the flavor, though this was rarely done.

While the US Bureau of Alcohol, Tobacco, Firearms and Explosives once recognized okolehao as a unique class, like vodka, gin, bourbon, tequila, whiskey, liqueur, etc., it is now recognized as a distilled spirits specialty (DSS), which requires the producer or distiller to submit the exact ingredients and general formula to the Alcohol and Tobacco Tax and Trade Bureau (TTB) and include a truthful and adequate statement of composition on the label.

For the short time okolehao was legally made in Hawaii after the war and into the sixties, the state of Hawaii granted okolehao a reduced tax rate. That reduced tax was ruled by the US federal government to be illegal due to discriminatory taxation of a spirit product.

Current production
Island Distillers in Honolulu makes 100-US-proof (50% Alcohol by volume) Hawaiian Okolehao, a re-creation of the original okolehao. There have been several past and recent productions of an okolehao type liqueur which is made by blending extracts of ti plant root, or ground up and emulsified ti root, with sugar syrup, rum, neutral spirits, bourbon, and other artificial and natural flavorings.  Liqueurs are generally sweet from the heavy sugar addition, and are considered rectified spirits rather than distilled spirits. They are between 60 and 80 US proof, and taste much like a sweet fruit brandy, bearing little resemblance to the original okolehao. True or original-style okolehao generally had alcohol content in the range of 85–100 proof, dependent on the efficiency of the distillation process. The finished product was determined at the point the moonshiner decided that their okolehao had the right "hit" or "punch". Some full-strength okolehaos were and are made at a proof up to 130 proof, 65% alcohol by volume, the proof obtainable by most illegal pot stills in a single pass.

Description
"Original", "real" okolehao taste depends primarily on the formula used, and the fermentation and distillation methods employed. As with all spirits, aging in oak barrels can produce a different flavor profile, but this is rarely done. Okolehao, like other moonshines from elsewhere, is usually consumed un-aged. Earthy, vegetal, hints of banana or pineapple, indeterminate tropical flavor: these adjectives and more have all been used to describe the original okolehao taste. It is a spirit unique to Hawaii, with a flavor of its own.

Cocktails
Okolehao is used as the main ingredient in a few cocktails, including the Chief's Calabash and the Lei Day cocktail. The Lei Day recipe from a 1947 edition of Honolulu Magazine calls for 1 jigger of okolehao, 1/2 jigger of Crème de Menthe, and a 1/4 jigger of absinthe (legal in Hawaii at the time).

Despite its Hawaiian origins, it is not commonly used in tiki drinks, likely because it was hard to get in California during the early days of Don the Beachcomber. Hawaiian bartender Harry Yee is attributed with inventing the Hot Buttered Okolehao, which may have been similar to Trader Vic's Hot buttered rum.

No recipes listing okolehao appeared in either of Trader Vic's drink guides. It is however sometimes used in Scorpion Bowls served in Hawaii, a nod to authenticism and the Scorpion cocktail's historical roots.

Tiki drink expert Jeff Berry lists a recipe similar to Vic's Scorpion and Kava Bowls named the Polynesian Paralysis, among others. The cocktail calls for 3 oz. okolehao, 3 oz. orange juice, 3 oz. unsweetened pineapple juice, and 3/4 oz. lemon juice along with orgeat syrup and other sweeteners blended with crushed ice.

In addition it has been used as a gin substitute in the Bee's Knees.

Pop culture references

On 3/7/1927, Sol Hoopii's Novelty Trio recorded 'Hula Blues', which became and has remained a very popular recording. It is a hapa-haole song, composed by two other famous Hawaiians, Sonny Cunha and Johnny Noble. The lyrics can be heard as a paean to okolehao: 'Oh, oh, oh-oh, the hula blues,/Tell me have you ever heard those hula blues./You can't imagine what you feeling blue about,/You simply get so full of pep you're starting to shout;/She wriggles and giggles and wiggles to those hula blues.//We want her, we crave her, we love her, okolehao./Oh, we want her, we crave her, we want her, okolehao, and now./You talk about your whisky, gin or wine;/There’s something makes you feel so dog-gone fine./Oh, we love her, we crave her, we want her, okolehao.'.

"Hawaiian Hospitality", a 1936 hit by Honolulu musicians Harry Owens and Ray Kinney, includes the line "When my dream of love comes true/There'll be okolehao for two." The beverage was a key ingredient in Hawaiian festivals such as the luau.

In Hawaii 5-0 air date December 17, 2012, Chin's uncle makes Ti root moonshine.

In Operation Pacific, a 1951 John Wayne movie, when Wayne's submarine crew get arrested for crashing and busting up a luau with the local Hawaiians asking for damages beyond Wayne's budget, he finds out the locals had illegal "okoolihau" which caused his men to get drunk. Wayne counters with a fine of equal amount to the damages to get them off the hook.

In "Think Fast, Mr. Moto" during a trip on an ocean liner to Hawaii, one of the guests asks the bartender what to order. He suggests a Panther's Kiss. He says it contains Okoolihao.

In the first Charlie Chan novel, The House Without a Key, a steward tells a main character, arriving from Boston, to "Keep away from the okolehau [sic]. A few gulps, and you hit the ceiling of eternity."

See also
Domesticated plants and animals of Austronesia

References

External links

Hawaiian distilled drinks
Liqueurs
Historical drinks